Meleh-ye Vali (also Romanized as Meleh-ye Valī; also known as Meleh-ye Valeh) is a village in Howmeh Rural District, in the Central District of Harsin County, Kermanshah Province, Iran. At the 2006 census, its population was 69, in 14 families.

References 

Populated places in Harsin County